Progress M-45, identified by NASA as Progress 5P, was a Progress spacecraft used to resupply the International Space Station. It was a Progress-M 11F615A55 spacecraft, with the serial number 245.

Launch
Progress M-45 was launched by a Soyuz-U carrier rocket from Site 1/5 at the Baikonur Cosmodrome. Launch occurred at 09:23:54 UTC on 21 August 2001.

Docking
The spacecraft docked with the aft port of the Zvezda module at 09:51:32 UTC on 23 August 2001.

It remained docked for 91 days before undocking at 16:12:01 UTC on 22 November 2001 to make way for Progress M1-7. It left debris on the docking port which prevented Progress M1-7 from achieving a hard dock until it was removed during an EVA on 3 December 2001. Progress M-45 was deorbited at 20:48:00 UTC on the same day that it undocked. The spacecraft burned up in the atmosphere over the Pacific Ocean, with any remaining debris landing in the ocean at around 21:35:23 UTC.

Progress M-45 carried supplies to the International Space Station, including food, water and oxygen for the crew and equipment for conducting scientific research.

See also

 List of Progress flights
 Uncrewed spaceflights to the International Space Station

References

Progress (spacecraft) missions
Supply vehicles for the International Space Station
Spacecraft launched in 2001
Spacecraft which reentered in 2001
Spacecraft launched by Soyuz-U rockets